In U.S. politics, the Hyde Amendment is a legislative provision barring the use of federal funds to pay for abortion, except to save the life of the woman, or if the pregnancy arises from incest or rape. Before the Hyde Amendment took effect in 1980, an estimated 300,000 abortions were performed annually using federal funds.

The original Hyde Amendment was passed on September 30, 1976, by the House of Representatives, with a 312–93 vote to override the veto of a funding bill for the Department of Health, Education, and Welfare (HEW). It was named for its chief sponsor, Republican Congressman Henry Hyde of Illinois. The measure represented one of the first major legislative gains by the United States anti-abortion movement following the 1973 Supreme Court decision in Roe v. Wade. 

Congress later altered the Hyde Amendment several times. The version in force from 1981 until 1993 prohibited the use of federal funds for abortions, "except where the life of the mother would be endangered if the fetus were carried to term". On October 22, 1993, President Clinton signed into law the Departments of Labor, Health and Human Services, and Education, and Related Agencies Appropriations Act, 1994. The Act contained a new version of the Hyde Amendment that expanded the category of abortions for which federal funds are available under Medicaid to include cases of rape and incest.

Background 

The Hyde Amendment was introduced by Illinois Republican Congressman Henry J. Hyde and first passed by Congress in 1977, four years after Roe vs. Wade. Implementation of the initial amendment was blocked for almost a year by an injunction in the McRae v. Matthews case. During this case, the Reproductive Freedom Project, the Center for Constitutional Rights, and Planned Parenthood collectively represented a pregnant Medicaid recipient and health care providers who challenged the Hyde Amendment. The United States Supreme Court vacated the injunction in August 1977, leading abortions financed by federal Medicaid to drop from 300,000 per year to a few thousand. Other bans were modeled after the Hyde Amendment, extending to other annual spending bills in the late 1970s and early 1980s. This eventually led federal funds to be banned in federal worker health plans, women in federal prisons, women in the military, peace corps volunteers, and international family planning programs that use non-U.S. funds to perform or advocate for abortion.

The Hyde Amendment has been re-enacted every year since 1976, but exceptions have varied. For example, the 1978 Amendment presented new exceptions for rape survivors and incest cases. In 1980, the Supreme Court upheld the constitutionality of the original Hyde Amendment language with a 5–4 vote in Harris v. McRae. The majority found that the Hyde Amendment did not violate the Establishment Clause under the First Amendment, or due process/equal protection provided by the Fifth Amendment.  This case decided the single exception for the Amendment would be in cases where the woman's life is endangered. This decision was upheld from fiscal years 1981–1993. In Webster v. Reproductive Health Services of Missouri, the court held that states could also enact measures like the Hyde Amendment. President George H.W. Bush vetoed a bill with the added exceptions. This decision left the Amendment with the sole exception of concern being endangered life of the mother. The language was not altered until the Clinton Administration in 1993. At this time, the Hyde Amendment was once again expanded to include exceptions for rape and incest cases.

In Williams v. Zbaraz (1980), the United States Supreme Court held that states could enact their own versions of the Hyde Amendment.

As of 1994, federal law mandates all states to pay for abortion cases involving rape or incest.

On January 24, 2017, the House voted to make the Hyde Amendment (H.R. 7) permanent. Speaker Paul Ryan (R-WI) stated, "We are a pro-life Congress", and he re-affirmed the government's commitment to restricting tax money to funding abortions. The bill failed to become law.

Arguments and effects 
Proponents of Hyde state that it is supported by 57% of the American public and opposed by 36%, as of 2016. Critics say the Hyde Amendment disproportionately affects low-income women, women of color, younger women, and immigrants, as an estimated 42% of abortion recipients live below the poverty line. Since the passage of the Hyde Amendment, more than one million women were not able to afford abortions. 18 to 33 percent of Medicaid-eligible women who desire abortions have also given birth because they live in states that do not provide funding.

The Hyde Amendment restricts abortion coverage for federally-funded health care recipients, specifically women enrolled in Medicare and Medicaid, Native American women, U.S. servicewomen and veterans, women in Peace Corps, federal employee families, D. C. women residents, and women in immigration detention facilities and prisons. The Hyde Amendment does not preclude women who receive health care through the U.S. government the option of paying for the procedure out of pocket. According to a 2014 national survey of abortion patients, women in states without Medicaid coverage of abortion were three times as likely to pay for their abortions out of pocket, and five times as likely to rely on financial assistance from an abortion fund, compared to women in states with Medicaid coverage.

State actions

17 states have a policy to use their own Medicaid funds to pay for abortion beyond the Hyde Amendment requirements, and an estimated 20% of abortions are paid through Medicaid.

As of 2021, 16 states use their own state funds to pay for elective abortions and similar services, exceeding federal requirements. 

Consequently, the cutoff of federal Medicaid funds prompted some states to provide public funding for abortion services from their own coffers. Over time the number of states doing so has gradually expanded, either through legislation or consequent to judicial rulings.

Specific stipulations have been put in place by some state governments. Some of these provisions remove restrictions that have been put in place at the federal level while others are used to further extend the reach that Hyde Amendment has put into place. For example, in Iowa, in order to receive an abortion under the Medicaid program, approval must be given from the governor. In Iowa, Mississippi, and Virginia, a provision has been made for the case of fetal impairment.

Further developments

Stupak-Pitts (2010)
The Stupak–Pitts Amendment, an amendment to the Affordable Health Care for America Act, was introduced by Democratic Rep. Bart Stupak of Michigan. It prohibits the use of Federal funds "to pay for any abortion or to cover any part of the costs of any health plan that includes coverage of abortion", except in cases of rape, incest, or danger to the life of the mother, and was included in the bill as passed by the House of Representatives on November 7, 2009. However, the Senate bill passed by the House on March 21, 2010, did not contain that Hyde Amendment language. As part of an agreement between Rep. Stupak and President Obama to secure Stupak's vote, the President issued Executive Order 13535 on March 24, 2010, affirming that the Hyde Amendment would extend to the new bill.

Hillary Clinton (2016) 
The 2016 Democratic platform marked the first major political party platform to include an explicit call to repeal the Hyde Amendment. The platform states:

We believe unequivocally, like the majority of Americans, that every woman should have access to quality reproductive health care services, including safe and legal abortion—regardless of where she lives, how much money she makes, or how she is insured. We believe that reproductive health is core to women's, men's, and young people's health and well being. We will continue to stand up to Republican efforts to defund Planned Parenthood health centers, which provide critical health services to millions of people. We will continue to oppose—and seek to overturn—federal and state laws and policies that impede a woman's access to abortion, including by repealing the Hyde Amendment.

Hillary Clinton advocated for a repeal of the Hyde Amendment throughout her 2016 Presidential campaign. She was quoted as saying, "Any right that requires you to take extraordinary measures to access it is no right at all", at a campaign rally in New Hampshire. The Democrat vice presidential candidate Tim Kaine reportedly stood with his running mate on the issue, despite formerly having been a supporter of the Hyde Amendment.

2018
In 2018, Republicans proposed adding the Hyde Amendment to the Affordable Care Act in the 2018 spending bill, in exchange for increased funding to reduce insurance premiums and adding re-insurance. However, this was rejected by Democrats. Former Speaker Paul Ryan had said that he would not bring measures to the floor on reducing ACA premiums without adding the Hyde Amendment language.

Joe Biden (2019–present) 
During the 2020 presidential campaign, Joe Biden reversed his previous support of the Hyde Amendment and pledged to work to overturn it if elected. In 2021, he introduced a 2022 budget that completely omitted the Hyde Amendment.

A Labor, Health and Human Services bill unveiled in 2021 excluded the amendment. However, the amendment was reinserted into the federal budget that was passed in March 2022. 

206 Democrats voted for the spending bill; 15 against it.  As reported in Roll Call, “Democrats voted overwhelmingly for the nondefense portion of the omnibus.” House Appropriations Chair Rosa DeLauro, D-Conn...."expressed frustration over her party's concession on Hyde. She said she's the ‘first appropriations chair since 1977 to remove it because I understand that this is an offensive and discriminatory policy which has shut out countless women from the reproductive health care that they deserve for more than 40 years.’”

See also
 Abortion in the United States
 Helms Amendment to the Foreign Assistance Act, an amendment from 1973 that restricts US federal funding for abortion overseas
 Rosie Jimenez, the first woman known to have died due to an unsafe abortion after the Hyde Amendment was passed
 Types of abortion restrictions in the United States

References

1976 in American law
Medicare and Medicaid (United States)
United States federal abortion legislation